Mafia Raaj is a 1998 Indian Hindi-language crime drama film directed by Yeshwantt and produced by Ashok Ratan, starring Mithun Chakraborty, Ayesha Jhulka, Shakti Kapoor and Sadashiv Amrapurkar.

Plot 
Inspector Suraj is successful in maintaining peace and order in his village and is hence promoted to the city to keep the Mafia under control. Suraj moves to the city along with her sister, Chanda. In the city he crosses path with dangerous underworld dons Dhapat Jackal and his brother Jacky Jackal. To teach Suraj a lesson, the duo rape his sister and kill his father. Now Suraj have to go against the law to get his family justice.

Cast 
Mithun Chakraborty as Police inspector Suraj
Ayesha Jhulka as Kanchan
Shakti Kapoor as Suratmal
Sadashiv Amrapurkar as Laturkar
Kiran Kumar as Dhanpat Jackal
Brij Gopal as Babu Bangda's Associate
Alok Nath as Lawyer, Arjun's Father
Arjun as Jacky Jackal
Tej Sapru as Police Inspector Ghag
Rami Reddy as Babu Bangda
Pramod Moutho as  Police Commissioner
 Karina Grover as Chanda an item number (special appearance)

Music 
"Choomantar" – Poornima, Bali Brahmabhatt; Sudesh Bhosle
"Dilruba Dilruba" – Suchitra Krishnamurthy
"HUngama Hai Teri Jawani" – Udit Narayan, Kavita Krishnamurthy
"Mainu Laagi Hai susu" – Sadhana Sargam, Abhijeet

Reception
Mukhtar Anjoom of Deccan Herald opined that "Mithun might make perfect business sense to his producers. But, watching him in such supremely stupid roles must be no mean task even to his dwindling fans".

References

External links 
 

1998 films
1990s Hindi-language films
Indian crime drama films
Mithun's Dream Factory films
Films shot in Ooty
Films scored by Dilip Sen-Sameer Sen
1998 crime films
Hindi-language crime films
Indian rape and revenge films